Rafaela Bezanilla Bezanilla (1797 – May 7, 1855) was First Lady of Chile and the wife of President José Tomás Ovalle y Bezanilla. She was born in Santiago, the daughter of Francisco de Bezanilla y de la Bárcena and of Juana Bezanilla y Abós Padilla. She and her husband had eight children together.

External links
Genealogical chart of Ovalle family 

First ladies of Chile
19th-century Chilean people
1797 births
1855 deaths